Sant'Elena Sannita is a comune (municipality) in the Province of Isernia in the Italian region Molise, located about  west of Campobasso and about  east of Isernia.The settlement was formerly inhabited by an Arbëreshë community, who have since assimilated.

Sant'Elena Sannita borders the following municipalities: Bojano, Casalciprano, Frosolone, Macchiagodena, Spinete.

References

Arbëresh settlements

Cities and towns in Molise